Lewis James Philip Jenkins (born 15 November 1981) is an English cricketer.  Jenkins is a right-handed batsman who bowls slow left-arm orthodox.  He was born at Canterbury, Kent.

Jenkins represented the Kent Cricket Board in List A cricket.  His debut List A match came against the Hampshire Cricket Board in the 2001 Cheltenham & Gloucester Trophy.  During the 2001 season, he represented the Board in 4 List A matches, the last of which came against the Leicestershire Cricket Board in the 2nd round of the 2002 Cheltenham & Gloucester Trophy which was played in 2001.  In his 4 List A matches, he scored 91 runs at a batting average of 91.00, with a single half century high score of 50*.  It was this unbeaten score which gave him such a high average.

He currently plays club cricket for St Lawrence Cricket Club in the Kent Cricket League.

References

External links
Lewis Jenkins at Cricinfo
Lewis Jenkins at CricketArchive

1981 births
Living people
Sportspeople from Canterbury
English cricketers
Kent Cricket Board cricketers